The Love Express (Swedish: Kärleksexpressen) is a 1932 Swedish drama film directed by Lorens Marmstedt and starring Lorens Marmstedt and starring Isa Quensel, Einar Axelsson and Nils Ohlin. The film's sets were designed by the art director Bertil Duroj.

Cast
 Isa Quensel as 	Detective's Niece
 Einar Axelsson as 	Weber
 Nils Ohlin as Adolf
 Anna Lindahl as 	Hilma
 Lili Ziedner as 	Rich Widow
 Eric Abrahamsson as 	Detective
 Anna-Lisa Baude		
 Doris Nelson

References

Bibliography 
 Qvist, Per Olov & von Bagh, Peter. Guide to the Cinema of Sweden and Finland. Greenwood Publishing Group, 2000.

External links 
 

1932 films
Swedish drama films
1932 drama films
1930s Swedish-language films
Films directed by Lorens Marmstedt
Swedish black-and-white films
1930s Swedish films